The 2017 IIHF World Championship, the 2017 edition of the annual Ice Hockey World Championships, was held from 5 to 21 May 2017 in Cologne, Germany and Paris, France. The official tournament mascots were Asterix and Obelix, the main characters from  popular French comic book series The Adventures of Asterix. The logo incorporates the silhouette of deceased German national team goaltender Robert Müller, who succumbed to a brain tumor at just 28 years of age. German tennis player Angelique Kerber, 1. FC Köln and German Olympic soccer team goalkeeper Timo Horn and Paris Saint-Germain F.C.'s Brazilian winger Lucas Moura were named celebrity ambassadors for the event.

Sweden won the tournament by defeating Canada 2–1 after a penalty shoot-out. Russia won the bronze medal game, defeating Finland 5–3.

Bids
There were two official bids to host these championships.

  Denmark/ Latvia
 Copenhagen/Riga
Denmark has never hosted these championships. Latvia hosted these championships for the first time in 2006. The proposed arenas were Arena Riga and the planned Copenhagen Arena.

  France/ Germany
 Paris/Cologne
France last hosted these championships in 1951. Germany hosted the championships most recently in 2010. The proposed arenas were AccorHotels Arena in Paris and Lanxess Arena in Cologne.

The decision on who hosts the tournament was decided on May 17, 2013 in Stockholm, Sweden. The united bid of France and Germany received 63 votes, while the bid of Denmark and Latvia received 45.

Participants

Seeding
The seeding in the preliminary round was based on the 2016 IIHF World Ranking, which ended at the conclusion of the 2016 IIHF World Championship.

Group A (Cologne)
 (2)
 (4)
 (5)
 (8)
 (10)
 (12)
 (13)
 (16)

Group B (Paris)
 (1)
 (3)
 (6)
 (7)
 (9)
 (11)
 (14)
 (15)

Venues

Rosters

Each team's roster consisted of at least 15 skaters (forwards, and defencemen) and 2 goaltenders, and at most 22 skaters and 3 goaltenders. All 16 participating nations, through the confirmation of their respective national associations, had to submit a "Long List" no later than two weeks before the tournament, and a final roster by the Passport Control meeting prior to the start of tournament.

Officials
The IIHF selected 16 referees and 16 linesmen to work the tournament.

Preliminary round
The schedule was announced on 9 August 2016.

Group A

Group B

Playoff round

Quarterfinals

Semifinals

Bronze medal game

Gold medal game

Ranking and statistics

Final ranking

Statistics

Scoring leaders
List shows the top skaters sorted by points, then goals.

GP = Games played; G = Goals; A = Assists; Pts = Points; +/− = Plus/minus; PIM = Penalties in minutes; POS = Position
Source: IIHF.com

Goaltending leaders
Only the top five goaltenders, based on save percentage, who have played at least 40% of their team's minutes, are included in this list.

TOI = Time on Ice (minutes:seconds); SA = Shots against; GA = Goals against; GAA = Goals against average; Sv% = Save percentage; SO = Shutouts
Source: IIHF.com

Awards
Best players selected by the directorate:
Best Goaltender:  Andrei Vasilevskiy
Best Defenceman:  Dennis Seidenberg
Best Forward:  Artemi Panarin
Source: IIHF.com

Media All-Stars:
MVP:  William Nylander
Goaltender:  Andrei Vasilevskiy
Defencemen:  Colton Parayko /  Dennis Seidenberg
Forwards:  William Nylander /  Artemi Panarin /  Nathan MacKinnon
Source: IIHF.com

References

External links
Official website

 
2010s in Cologne
IIHF World Championship
2017 IIHF Men's World Ice Hockey Championships
IIHF World Championship
IIHF World Championship
IIHF World Championship
International ice hockey competitions hosted by France
International ice hockey competitions hosted by Germany
International sports competitions hosted by Paris
IIHF World Championship
IIHF World Championship
Sports competitions in Cologne